People's Council elections were held in Turkmenistan on 9 December 2007. The elections were only for a part of the 2,507 members of the People's Council, and all of the candidates were of the ruling Democratic Party of Turkmenistan.

Results

References

Elections in Turkmenistan
Turkmenistan
People's Council election